George Percival St John Hilliard (b 1945) was the Dean of Cloyne from 1985 to 2002.

He was educated at Trinity College, Dublin and ordained in 1970. After a curacy at Carrickfergus he was the incumbent at Fanlobbus until his appointment as Dean.

References

1945 births
Alumni of Trinity College Dublin
Irish Anglicans
Deans of Cloyne
Living people